Helina pertusa is a fly from the family Muscidae. It is the type species on the Genus Helina.

Description
6 - 8.5mm Eyes are bare. Black tarsi.

Biology
Larvae are found in leaf litter.

Distribution
Most of west and central Europe.

References

Muscidae
Diptera of Europe
Insects described in 1826
Taxa named by Johann Wilhelm Meigen